Mike Moher (born March 26, 1962 in Manitouwadge, Ontario) is a Canadian retired ice hockey right winger. He played junior hockey for the Kitchener Rangers with whom he won the Memorial Cup in 1982. He also won a gold medal with the Canadian junior team at the 1982 World Junior Ice Hockey Championships. Selected 106th overall by the New Jersey Devils in the 1982 NHL Entry Draft, Moher made his NHL debut February 27, 1983 and played nine games with the team in 1982–83, recording one assist. He spent the rest of the season with the Wichita Wind, and played one more season with the Maine Mariners before retiring in 1984 at the age of 22.

Career statistics

Regular season and playoffs

References

External links
 

1962 births
Living people
Canadian ice hockey right wingers
Ice hockey people from Ontario
Kitchener Rangers players
Maine Mariners players
New Jersey Devils draft picks
New Jersey Devils players
People from Thunder Bay District
Sudbury Wolves players
Wichita Wind players